Wild Wing Cafe is a restaurant chain in the southern and eastern parts of the United States with 44 locations in nine U.S. states and best known for chicken wings and beer selection. It is headquartered in Charlotte, North Carolina.

Background
Their chain's motto is "Hot Wings, Cold Beer, Good Times." Wild Wing Cafe was started by Atlanta native Cecil Crowley and his wife Dianne, who opened the chain's first location in Hilton Head, South Carolina in June 1990. By 2001, it had grown to seven locations. In January 2012, a majority interest in the chain was secured by Charlotte, North Carolina-based Axum Capital Partnership, an investment company whose founders include a former National Football League Pro Bowler, Muhsin Muhammad.

Some locations feature live music in the evenings, and recording artist Edwin McCain started his career playing shows at Wild Wing Cafe.

Locations
Wild Wing Cafe is currently located throughout nine different states in the U.S. with a total of 44 locations as of 2019. Some operations are company owned locations whereas some are franchised.

References

Chicken chains of the United States
Companies based in Charleston, South Carolina
Restaurants established in 1990
Restaurants in South Carolina
1990 establishments in South Carolina
Hilton Head Island, South Carolina